Florian Mayer was the defending champion but lost to Xavier Malisse in the second round.
Gilles Simon won the tournament defeating Fabio Fognini 6–4, 6–3 in the final.

Seeds
Top 4 active seeds received a bye into the second round.

Draw

Finals

Top half

Bottom half

Qualifying

Seeds

Qualifiers

Lucky losers
  Érik Chvojka

Draw

First qualifier

Second qualifier

Third qualifier

Fourth qualifier

References
 Main Draw
 Qualifying Draw

BRD Nastase Tiriac Trophy - Singles
2012 Singles